Rolf Fjellmann is a Swedish sprint canoer who competed in the mid-1950s. He won two silver medals at the 1954 ICF Canoe Sprint World Championships in Mâcon, earning them in the K-2 10000 m and K-4 10000 m events.

References

Living people
Swedish male canoeists
Year of birth missing (living people)
ICF Canoe Sprint World Championships medalists in kayak